Mulungu Airport  is an airport serving the town of Mulungu in Sud-Kivu Province, Democratic Republic of the Congo.

See also

Transport in the Democratic Republic of the Congo
List of airports in the Democratic Republic of the Congo

References

External links
 FallingRain - Mulungu Airport
 HERE Maps - Mulungu
 OpenStreetMap - Mulungu
 OurAirports - Mulungu
 

Airports in South Kivu